The wushu competition at the 2013 World Games was held from August 2 to August 3 at the Evangelista Mora Coliseum in Cali, Colombia. This was the second time wushu was featured as an invitational sport at the games, with its first appearance being in 2009.

Participating nations

Medal summary

Medal table

Taolu

Sanda

References 

2013 World Games
2013 in wushu (sport)
Wushu at the World Games